Randy Greg Voepel (born September 21, 1950) is an American politician. He served in the city government of Santee, California and in the California State Assembly from the 71st district. He was the vice-chair of the Veterans Affairs, Aging & Long-Term Care, and Public Employment & Retirement committees and a member of the Insurance, Local Government, and Joint Legislative Audit committees. Voepel lost his reelection bid in the 2022 California State Assembly election, with his term ending on December 6, 2022.

Early life 
On September 21, 1950, Voepel was born in Saint Charles, Missouri. In August 1969, Voepel enlisted in the United States Navy. During the Vietnam War, Voepel served on the USS Buchanan, a guided-missile destroyer. Voepel received the Combat Action Ribbon and military awards.

Career 
In 1996, Voepel became a member of the Santee City Council. In 2000, Voepel became the Mayor of Santee until 2016.

On November 8, 2016, Voepel won the election and became a Republican member of California State Assembly for District 71, encompassing most of inland San Diego County and part of Riverside County.

In 2022, redistricting would have placed him into a new district with another member of the state Assembly, Marie Waldron, but Voepel lost by a wide margin.

Political views
Voepel has aligned himself with the Tea Party movement, saying that the Republican Party was too liberal. Following the January 6 United States Capitol attack, Voepel said, "This is Lexington and Concord. First shots fired against tyranny. Tyranny will follow in the aftermath of the Biden swear-in on January 20th."

Electoral history

2020 California State Assembly

2018 California State Assembly

2016 California State Assembly

Awards 
 Combat Action Ribbon.
 Vietnam Cross Gallantry.

Personal life 
Voepel was formerly married to Pamela Palmer.  He is now married to Susan.  He has two adult children. His grandson is identified as the suspect charged in the 2022 Colorado Springs nightclub shooting. His former son-in-law is Aaron Brink, a mixed martial arts fighter and former pornographic film actor. Voepel and his wife live in Santee, California.

References

External links 

 
 Campaign website
 Randy Voepel at ballotpedia.org
 Randy Greg Voepel's Pentagon record at documentcloud.org
 USS Buchannan Deck Log
 Join California Randy Voepel

1950 births
Living people
20th-century American politicians
21st-century American politicians
American military personnel of the Vietnam War
California city council members
California Republicans
Mayors of places in California
Republican Party members of the California State Assembly
Missouri politicians
Missouri Republicans
People from Santee, California
People from St. Charles, Missouri